Glide is the tenth solo album by American dobro player Jerry Douglas, released in 2008 (see 2008 in music).

Guest musicians include Rodney Crowell, Sam Bush, Tony Rice, Travis Tritt, and Earl Scruggs.

Track listing
 "Bounce" (Sam Bush, Jerry Douglas, Edgar Meyer) – 4:39
 "Glide" (Douglas) – 3:38
 "Marriage Made in Hollywood" (Paul Brady, Michael O'Keefe) – 5:20
 "Route Irish" (Douglas) – 4:07
 "Sway Sur La Rue Royale" (Douglas) – 6:06
 "Unfolding" (Meyer) – 6:22
 "Long Hard Road (The Sharecropper's Dream)" (Rodney Crowell) – 4:29
 "Home Sweet Home" (Traditional) – 2:36
 "Two Small Cars in Rome" (Douglas) – 4:05
 "Trouble on Alum" (Traditional) – 4:21
 "Pushed Too Far" (Douglas, Russ Barenberg) – 4:53

There is an untitled song hidden in the pregap before track 1. Search backward from the start of track 1 to reach it.  The hidden song lasts about 4 minutes and is a rock instrumental with electric guitar, bass, and drums.  Total disc time with the hidden track is 55:08.

Personnel
Jerry Douglas – dobro, lap steel guitar, vocals
Sam Bush – mandolin
Doug Belote – drums
Lloyd Green – pedal steel guitar
Edgar Meyer – bass ("Bounce")
Todd Parks – bass
Luke Bulla – fiddle, background vocals
Rodney Crowell – background vocals
Carmella Ramsey – background vocals
Travis Tritt – vocals
Earl Scruggs – banjo
David Torkanowsky – piano
Tony Rice – guitar
Guthrie Trapp – guitar
Dennis Wage – keyboards
Kirk Joseph – sousaphone
Orange Kellin – clarinet
Charlie Fardella – trumpet
Production notes:
Jerry Douglas – producer
Bil VornDick – engineer
Steve Crowder – assistant engineer
Chris Finney – assistant engineer
Bryan Graban – assistant engineer
Jason Lefan – assistant engineer
Leslie Richter – assistant engineer
Spencer Walts – design

Chart performance

2008 albums
Jerry Douglas albums
MNRK Music Group singles